Richard Yarsuvat (born 24 May 1992) is a Swedish footballer who plays as a striker.

Career
He was the top scorer of 2017 Superettan for Dalkurd FF, but left the club after only one season following their promotion to the top tier.

Personal life
Yarsuvat was born in Sweden to a Turkish father, and a Kosovan-Albanian mother.

References

External links

1992 births
Living people
People from Borås
Swedish footballers
Sweden youth international footballers
Swedish people of Turkish descent
Swedish people of Kosovan descent
Swedish people of Albanian descent
Association football forwards
Ettan Fotboll players
Dalkurd FF players
IF Elfsborg players
IFK Värnamo players
Örgryte IS players
Allsvenskan players
Superettan players
Norrby IF players
Syrianska FC players
GAIS players
Sportspeople from Västra Götaland County